Aleksander Michałowski (17 October 1938) was a Polish pianist, pedagogue and composer who, in addition to his own immense technique, had a profound influence upon the teaching of pianoforte technique, especially in relation to the works of Chopin and J.S. Bach, and left this legacy among a large number of pupils.

Early life and training 
Aleksander Michałowski was born in 1851 in Kamianets-Podilskyi in Ukraine, then part of the Russian Empire.  From 1867, at the age of 16, he studied at Leipzig Conservatory as a pupil of Ignaz Moscheles, Carl Reinecke and Theodor Coccius. Coccius was his greatest influence, and he was industrious, often practising for 10 hours a day. In 1869 he went to Berlin and studied under Carl Tausig. (Tausig attempted to make him adopt a very high finger position, which nearly ruined his technique.) He moved to Warsaw, where he settled permanently, in 1870.

At about this time he made the friendship of Karol Mikuli (1821-1897), who had received lessons from Chopin between 1844 and 1848, and was head of the Lviv Conservatory. Mikuli imparted to him many of the composer's own ideas about the performance of his works; Michałowski also met Chopin's gifted pupil Princess Marcelina Czartoryska (née Radziwiłł), who played some mazurkas for him. Moscheles had also been a friend of Chopin's, and therefore Michałowski obtained a rich understanding of Chopin's pianistic thought and performance.

His Chopin style 
He was familiar with all Chopin's works, and devoted a lifetime to their study. In performance, he occasionally altered the musical text, and transcribed some in the manner of Moriz Rosenthal. In 1878 he visited Franz Liszt at Weimar, and at first (having connections with the Leipzig Conservatory) was not made welcome, but afterwards made such an impression that Liszt acknowledged his authenticity of performance and approved the variants that he introduced. A later successor at Warsaw Zbigniew Drzewiecki wrote:
'As an interpreter of Chopin he created a certain style of rendering the composer's works which found many imitators. It consisted of the chiselling of swift passages and stressing their elegance in smoothing the edges of sharper expressive climaxes, in lending Chopin's works the air of almost drawing-room sentimentality. And yet this slight sentimentality was always under the strict control of moderation, instrumental purity and good taste.'

Teaching principles 
In 1874 he settled in Warsaw and took up teaching, at first privately. From 1891 he became professor of the concert pianists' class at the Warsaw Institute of Music (at that time under the direction of Apolinary Katski), and continued there until 1918, after which he taught at the Fryderyk Chopin Music School of the Warsaw Music Society. He particularly emphasised the importance of contrapuntal playing, and during the first two years of his students' work with him he made them play a lot of J.S. Bach. In the case of one of his most famous pupils, Wanda Landowska, this led to a career dedicated to Bach and to baroque music. Chopin himself had a particular sympathy for Bach, and Michałowski understood that the contrapuntal principles were most important for the understanding of Chopin's work. He also developed the imaginative and bravura aspects of his students' playing. He used much demonstration in his lessons, and encouraged students to imitate aspects of his own performance.

Students and successors
Among his very many students were several who might have had more famous international careers had not the two world wars interrupted or in some cases terminated their work. Among them was Jerzy Żurawlew, who founded the International Chopin Piano Competitions in 1927. Wanda Landowska, Vladimir Sofronitsky  and Mischa Levitzki were probably the most famous pupils. Jerzy Lefeld became his amanuensis. Bolesław Kon, an outstanding pupil, who also studied with Konstantin Igumnov, died in 1936 aged 30. Róża Etkin-Moszkowska was killed in the German retreat from Warsaw in 1944. Henryk Pachulski (b. 1859) and Piotr Maszyński (b. 1855) were among his earlier pupils, and Stanislaw Urstein, Edwarda Chojnacka, Wiktor Chapowicki, Józef Śmidowicz, Vladimir Sofronitsky, and Bolesław Woytowicz among the later ones. Heinrich Neuhaus, a renowned teacher, whose own pupils included Sviatoslav Richter, Emil Gilels, Yakov Zak and Ryszard Bakst, received lessons from Michałowski. Radziwonowicz also lists Stefania Allina, Zofia Buckiewiczowa, Janina Familier Hepner, Zofia Frankiewicz, Stefania Niekrasz, Stanislaw Nawrocki, Ludomir Różycki, Piotr Rytel, Henryk Schulz-Evler, Władysław Szpilman, Juliusz Wolfsohn and Alexander Zakin as Michałowski pupils. Józef Turczyński, his immediate successor at Warsaw, and after him Zbigniew Drzewiecki, were not his students but continued his work as leading teachers of the Polish school.

Later career 
Michałowski was also a chamber musician, and performing duos with the violinist Stanisław Barcewicz, and trios with Barcewicz and the cellist Aleksandr Verzhbilovich.

He wrote 35 pianoforte works (mostly short, brilliant items) and produced an instructive edition of the works of Chopin. He made a substantial number of gramophone records, made in three different periods, the first around 1906, the second around 1918, and the last in the 1930s. Harold C. Schonberg considered that they revealed a 'heroic voice.' Although he had been a very successful concert performer, he increasingly turned to teaching, particularly when his sight failed rapidly after 1912. However he was persuaded back to the platform by a colleague, Mme Ruszczycówna, and gave large numbers of concerts in the following years, in 1919 celebrating a half-century since his debut. In 1929 he performed both Chopin concerti in a single concert.

He died in Warsaw aged 87, on 17 October 1938, the anniversary of the death of Chopin.

Discographie 

2016 : Acte Préalable AP0365 – Aleksander Michałowski - Piano Works 1 (Artur Cimirro)

See also
List of Poles

Notes

Sources 
Arthur Eaglefield Hull, A Dictionary of Modern Music and Musicians (Dent, London 1924).
J. Methuen-Campbell, Chopin Playing from the Composer to the Present Day (Gollancz, London 1981).
H.C. Schonberg, The Great Pianists (Gollancz, London 1964).

External links
 
 Prof Karol Radziwonowicz, The Greatest Polish Pianists in the History of Chopin's Time till today (Chopinov Zlati Prstan, 3 Oct 2007: KULTURNICA BLAŽ KUMERDEJ, Gorenjska cesta 25)

 Scores by Aleksander Michałowski in digital library Polona

1851 births
1938 deaths
People from Kamianets-Podilskyi
People from Kamenets-Podolsky Uyezd
Polish composers
Polish classical pianists
Male classical pianists
Lviv Conservatory alumni
Academic staff of the Chopin University of Music
Piano pedagogues
Władysław Szpilman
Officers of the Order of Polonia Restituta